Baudo may refer to{

Places
Baudó Mountains, a mountain range on the Pacific coast of Colombia
Baudó River in Colombia

People
Pippo Baudo, Italian TV personality 
Serge Baudo, French conductor

Animal species
Baudó oropendola, bird species 
Baudo guan, bird species

See also
Boudot, a surname